is one of 24 wards of Osaka city in Japan. The ward is primarily a residential quarter, but has some office buildings and a commercial district, as well as factories and wholesale businesses.
In recent years, many high rise apartment buildings and office buildings have been built in this ward, because it is close to the Umeda and Dōjima business centres.

It is bordered by the Yodo River on the north, and the Dōjima River on the south.

History 

This district (north part of Dōjima) was a suburban farm village during the Edo period, and large factories, especially textile factories, were built during the Meiji period. Panasonic, then Matsushita Electric Industrial Co., was established in 1918 in Fukushima-ku. Even today, there are many printing companies and automobile parts wholesalers in the ward. Prior to World War II, Osaka University Hospital and Osaka City Central Market were located here. After World War II, many office buildings were built around JR Fukushima station, because it is close to Umeda (the business centre of western Japan). Other areas of Fukushima-ku were converted from factories into residential areas and commercial districts.

In 2008, Hotarumachi was redeveloped at the former site of Osaka University Hospital. In 2019, north of Hanshin Noda Station, the large factory site of former Shionogi Research Laboratories and Dainippon Sumitomo Pharma Osaka Center will be redeveloped into residential and shopping center.

Places of interest

Buildings 

 The Tower Osaka (residential), 177 m high, 50 floors
 Crevia Tower Nakanoshima (residential), 127 m high, 34 floors
 Osaka Nakanoshima Combined Government Office, 115 m high, 24 floors
 Asahi Broadcasting Corporation (broadcasting), 16 floors
 Gate Tower Building, with part of the Hanshin Expressway passing directly through the 5th to 7th floors of the building

Parks 
 Yodo River Park
 Shimo-fukushima Park

Shopping Center 
 WISTE Noda-Hanshin shopping center (AEON shopping mall)
 Kohnan hardware store, Oobiraki branch

Hospitals 
 JCHO Osaka Hospital (former Koseinenkin Hospital)
 Kansai Electric Power Co. Hospital

Company Headquarters 
 Hanshin Electric Railway Co., Ltd.
 Asahi Broadcasting Corporation (radio and TV broadcast)
 Osaka Nikkan Sports (newspaper)

Major factories 

 Toppan Printing  Kansai Division (Office, Printing factory)
 Rengo: Yodogawa Factory (Paper manufacture)
 Fukuyama Transporting: Osaka distribution centre (Truck terminal)

Historical sites
 Fukuzawa Yukichi birthplace (at Hotarumachi)
 Sakaro-no-matsu monument
 Fukushima-tenmangu shrine
 Noda-ebisu-jinjya shrine

Transport

Rail 
West Japan Railway Company (JR West)
Osaka Loop Line: Fukushima Station) - Noda Station
JR Tōzai Line: Shin-Fukushima Station - Ebie Station
Hanshin Electric Railway
Main Line: Fukushima Station - Noda Station - Yodogawa Station
Osaka Metro
Sennichimae Line: Nodahanshin Station - Tamagawa Station
Keihan Electric Railway
Nakanoshima Line: Nakanoshima Station

Road 
Hanshin Expressway: Kobe Route and Ikeda Route
National Route 2

References

External links

  

 
Wards of Osaka